An Ideal Adventure (Italian: Sballato, gasato, completamente fuso) is a 1982 Italian comedy film directed by Stefano Vanzina and starring Edwige Fenech, Diego Abatantuono and Liù Bosisio.

Cast
 Edwige Fenech as Patrizia Reda 
 Diego Abatantuono as Duccio Tricarico 
 Liù Bosisio  as Orietta Fallani 
 Mauro Di Francesco as Pippo - De Pino's valet 
 Enrico Maria Salerno as Eugenio Zafferi 
 Cinzia de Ponti as Zafferi's Daughter 
 Stefano Gragnani  as Office Boy 
 Peter Berling  as Brian De Pino 
 Maria Rosaria Spadola 
 Sandro Ghiani  as The Zookeeper 
 Giorgio Giuliani  as Giorgetti - Patrizia's colleague 
 Ivana Milan as Claudia - Zafferi's Second Daughter 
 Annibale Rocco

References

Bibliography 
 Roberto Chiti & Roberto Poppi. Dizionario del cinema italiano: Volume 5. Gremese Editore, 1991.

External links 
 

1982 films
Italian comedy films
1982 comedy films
1980s Italian-language films
Films directed by Stefano Vanzina
Films scored by Detto Mariano
1980s Italian films